The 2018–19 Welsh Premier League was the tenth season of the Women's Welsh Premier League, the top level women's football league in Wales. The season began on 2 September 2018 and ended on 28 April 2019.

Cardiff Metropolitan Ladies completed the domestic treble after winning the league title, the FAW Women's Cup and the Welsh Premier Women's Cup. This was their sixth league title and an unbeaten season, winning 14 and drawing 2 of their 16 games. It was their second consecutive league title. It was also the third time they had won the FAW Women's Cup and the third time they had won the Welsh Premier Women's Cup.

Madison Schupbach of Cardiff Metropolitan won both the Golden Boot after scoring 18 goals and Player of the Season in her first year in the league. Young Player of the Season was awarded to Shaunna Jenkins of Swansea City.

Clubs

After finishing in the bottom two in the 2017–18 season, Caernarfon Town ended up remaining in the top division after the North Wales Women's League winners Northop Hall did not apply for promotion. However, in November Caernarfon Town withdrew from the league with immediate effect and their results up until that point were expunged. The league continued with nine teams competing. After relegation in the 2016–17 season, Briton Ferry Llansawel made an immediate return to the top flight for the 2018–19 season.

Standings

Awards

Annual awards

League Cup
This was the sixth season of the WPWL Cup. The previous season's winners Cyncoed Ladies were drawn first out of the hat, meaning they were one of four teams who would play in the first round, as the rest of the teams received a bye into the quarter finals. However, they made it no further than the quarter finals as they were knocked out by eventual winners Cardiff Metropolitan. Cardiff Metropolitan beat Swansea City 3–1 in the final.

Round One

Quarter-finals

Semi-finals

Final

References 

Welsh Premier Women's Football League seasons